The Breitling Chronomat is a watch that was released in 1941 in Switzerland by Breitling SA. Since then it has been one of the best selling watches produced by Breitling.

History
The first Chronomat had a circular slide rule and its design followed the tension of the era for military watches. The movement of the first Chronomat was the Venus 175 with 17 jewels, a manual wind movement.

Current model
The current Chronomat was released in 2009 and was the first watch produced entirely by Breitling, featuring the in-house B01 caliber. The previous model had a Valjoux "7750" movement. The B01 movement has a 70-hour power reserve and COSC certification.

References

Breitling SA